King Hunther is a 2011 Sri Lankan Sinhala comedy film directed by Jayaprakash Sivagurunathan and produced by Dhammika Siriwardena for Alankulama Films. It stars Vijaya Nandasiri, Anarkali Akarsha and Mahendra Perera in lead roles along with Kumara Thirimadura and Anarkali Akarsha. Music co-composed by Mahesh Denipitiya and Jananath Warakagoda. It is the 1158th Sri Lankan film in the Sinhala cinema.

The film successfully completed fifty days of screening.

Plot
The film takes place where an ancient King Hunther (Vijaya) was awaken by a hundred years sleep and started to modernize to present day world. He finally became a minister with the help of his present day friends Hector (Mahendra) and Moreen (Anarkali).

Cast
 Vijaya Nandasiri as King Hunter / Ahethuka
 Anarkali Akarsha as Moreen
 Mahendra Perera as Hector
 Kumara Thirimadura as Minister Meththananda
 Giriraj Kaushalya as Benja
 Semini Iddamalgoda as Minister's wife Neetha
 Sanath Gunathilake as Nayakathuma
 Janith Wickramage as Chamika
 Denuwan Senadhi as Hiru
 Himali Siriwardena in item song
 Richard Manamudali
 Dayasiri Hettiarachchi
 Nethalie Nanayakkara

Soundtrack

References

2011 films
2010s Sinhala-language films
2011 comedy films
Sri Lankan comedy films